Aksu is a Turkish surname. Notable people with the surname include:

Abdülkadir Aksu (born 1944), Turkish politician
Bora Aksu, London-based Turkish fashion designer
Cafercan Aksu (born 1987), Turkish footballer
Sezen Aksu (born 1954), Turkish pop musician

Turkish-language surnames